The Wrath of Magra is a role-playing video game published by Carnell Software and Mastertronic for the ZX Spectrum in 1985. It is a sequel to 1983's Volcanic Dungeon.

Gameplay

Plot
In Volcanic Dungeon, the Knight of Star Jewel rescued the kidnapped Princess Edora and killed her evil captor Magra, the most powerful sorceress in the world. However, Magra has been restored back to life by her followers and wants revenge upon the man who defeated her. She cursed Edora and so the knight needs to once again save the princess. He needs to reach Magra's the castle in the Black Mountains and find a way to destroy the witch forever.

Reception
Wrath of Magra was generally well received. It received review ratings of 30/40 from Personal Computer Games and 8/10 from Sinclair User. Crash, however, gave it an average score of 5/10, while Computer and Video Games scored it only 3/10.

D J Robinson reviewed The Wrath of Magra for Imagine magazine, and stated that "In conclusion, The Wrath of Magra is an exceptionally good adventure, well written and presented, with a vast amount of atmosphere and the best background material I have ever seen."

References

External links
The Wrath of Magra at the World of Spectrum

1984 video games
Dungeon crawler video games
Fantasy video games
Role-playing video games
Single-player video games
Video game sequels
Video games developed in the United Kingdom
Video games about witchcraft
ZX Spectrum games
ZX Spectrum-only games
Mastertronic games
Carnell Software games